Roger Field may refer to:

 Roger C. Field (born 1945), British inventor
 Roger Field (plant scientist), British-born New Zealand plant scientist and university administrator